Margarete Kupfer (born Margarete Kupferschmid; 10 April 1881 – 11 May 1953) was a German actress.

Partial filmography

 The Canned Bride (1915)
 Frau Eva (1916)
 The Queen's Secretary (1916)
 When Four Do the Same (1917)
 The Ballet Girl (1918)
 I Don't Want to Be a Man (1918)
 The Foreign Prince (1918)
 The Rosentopf Case (1918)
 The Seeds of Life (1918)
 Carmen (1918)
 Prince Cuckoo (1919)
 The Loves of Käthe Keller (1919)
 The Dancer (1919)
 Sumurun (1920)
 Wibbel the Tailor (1920)
 The Head of Janus (1920)
 Countess Walewska (1920)
 Judith Trachtenberg (1920)
 Waves of Life and Love (1921)
 A Woman's Revenge (1921)
 The Devil and Circe (1921)
 The Hunt for the Truth (1921)
 The Story of a Maid (1921)
 Children of Darkness (1921)
 The Devil's Chains (1921)
 Nathan the Wise (1922)
 Bigamy (1922)
 Only One Night (1922)
 Gold and Luck (1923)
 Nanon (1924)
 Girls You Don't Marry (1924)
 Debit and Credit (1924)
 Dudu, a Human Destiny (1924)
 Orient (1924)
 The Four Marriages of Matthias Merenus (1924)
 Playing with Destiny (1924)
 The Voice of the Heart (1924)
 The Humble Man and the Chanteuse (1925)
 Slums of Berlin (1925)
 Three Waiting Maids (1925)
 The Woman with That Certain Something (1925)
 Women You Rarely Greet (1925)
 The Elegant Bunch (1925)
 Cock of the Roost (1925)
 The Morals of the Alley (1925)
 The Marriage Swindler (1925)
 The Motorist Bride (1925)
 If You Have an Aunt (1925)
 The Salesgirl from the Fashion Store (1925)
 Comedians (1925)
 The Woman without Money (1925)
 The Red Mouse (1926)
 Countess Ironing-Maid (1926)
 I Liked Kissing Women (1926)
 Watch on the Rhine (1926)
 Love's Joys and Woes (1926)
 People to Each Other (1926)
 Fräulein Mama (1926)
 Hunted People (1926)
 The Schimeck Family (1926)
 The Bank Crash of Unter den Linden (1926)
 The Tales of Hermann (1926)
 Children of No Importance (1926)
 The Heart of a German Mother (1926)
 The Bohemian Dancer (1926)
 Why Get a Divorce? (1926)
 Torments of the Night (1926)
 Radio Magic (1927)
 Endangered Girls (1927)
 The Island of Forbidden Kisses (1927)
 One Plus One Equals Three (1927)
 The Awakening of Woman (1927)
 Klettermaxe (1927)
 The Island of Forbidden Kisses (1927)
 Marie's Soldier (1927)
 The Villa in Tiergarten Park (1927)
 Circle of Lovers (1927)
 Carnival Magic (1927)
 That Was Heidelberg on Summer Nights (1927)
 The Love of Jeanne Ney (1927)
 Weekend Magic (1927)
 Eva in Silk (1928)
 Lemke's Widow (1928)
 Today I Was With Frieda (1928)
 Suzy Saxophone (1928)
 Almenrausch and Edelweiss (1928)
 Darling of the Dragoons (1928)
 Beyond the Street (1929)
 Woman in the Moon (1929)
 The Customs Judge (1929)
 Foolish Happiness (1929)
 What's Wrong with Nanette? (1929)
 From a Bachelor's Diary (1929)
 Cyanide (1930)
 Fairground People (1930)
 It Happens Every Day (1930)
 Rendezvous (1930)
 Der Kongreß tanzt (1931)
 Waves of Life and Love (1921)
 The Unfaithful Eckehart (1931)
 A Tremendously Rich Man (1932)
 A Night in Paradise (1932)
 Thea Roland (1932)
 Spoiling the Game (1932)
 The Blue of Heaven (1932)
 Three from the Unemployment Office (1932)
 Paprika (1932)
 The Sandwich Girl (1933)
 And Who Is Kissing Me? (1933)
 Gretel Wins First Prize (1933)
 Greetings and Kisses, Veronika (1933)
 Bon Voyage (1933)
 The Black Whale (1934)
 Polish Blood (1934)
 At the Strasbourg (1934)
 A Precocious Girl (1934)
 The Sporck Battalion (1934)
 The Gypsy Baron (1935)
 The Violet of Potsdamer Platz (1936)
 Escapade (1936)
 Woman's Love—Woman's Suffering (1937)
 The Roundabouts of Handsome Karl (1938)
 Target in the Clouds (1939)
 A Woman Like You (1939)
 The Three Codonas (1940)
 Mein Leben für Irland (1941)
 Two in a Big City (1942)
 Somewhere in Berlin (1946)
 No Place for Love (1947)
 Martina (1949)

Bibliography
 Jung, Uli & Schatzberg, Walter. Beyond Caligari: The Films of Robert Wiene. Berghahn Books, 1999.

External links

1881 births
1953 deaths
People from Kożuchów
German stage actresses
German film actresses
German silent film actresses
People from the Province of Silesia
20th-century German actresses